USA-197, also known as DSP-23, is a missile detection satellite and part of the Defense Support Program that was launched in 2007.

Launch 
United Launch Alliance (ULA) performed the launch of USA-197 using a Delta IV Heavy rocket in from SLC-37B of the Cape Canaveral Space Force Station on November 11th, 2007.

References 

Spacecraft launched in 2007
Spacecraft launched by Delta IV rockets
Satellites of the United States
Early warning satellites